Hell on Wheels is a 2007 documentary film telling the story of a group of Texas women who band together to resurrect roller derby for the 21st century. Emerging from the Austin music and arts scene, these women create a rock-and-roll fueled version of all-girl roller derby that has spawned the derby craze that's sweeping the nation.

Soundtrack
The film features original music by ...And You Will Know Us by the Trail of Dead.

Crew 
Director: Bob Ray
Producer: Werner Campbell & Bob Ray
Editor: Conor O’Neill, Cory Ryan
Music: ...And You Will Know Us by the Trail of Dead

Cast 
TXRD Lonestar Rollergirls (BGGW)
Nancy Haggerty
Anya Jack
Heather Burdick
April Herman
Sara Luna
Amanda Fields
Texas Rollergirls
Lane Greer
Laurie Rourke
Theresa Papas
Amy Sherman
Rachelle Moore

External links 

 CrashCam Films (Home Page) - filmmaker Bob Ray's Austin, Texas based production company that produced Hell on Wheels
 

Documentary films about women's sports
2007 films
Roller derby films
History of women in Texas
2000s English-language films
Women's sports in Texas